Kanthippara  is a village in Idukki district in the Indian state of Kerala.

Demographics
 India census, Kanthippara had a population of 10584 with 5322 males and 5262 females.

References

Villages in Idukki district